National Secondary Route 124, or just Route 124 (or ) is a National Road Route of Costa Rica, located in the Alajuela province.

Description
In Alajuela province the route covers Alajuela canton (Alajuela, San Antonio, Guácima, San Rafael districts).

References

Highways in Costa Rica